Bornmann Glacier is a glacier flowing from the west side of Hallett Peninsula  south of Seabee Hook and forming a short, floating ice tongue on the shore of Edisto Inlet. It was named by the New Zealand Geological Survey Antarctic Expedition, 1957–58, for Lieutenant Robert C. Bornmann, MC, U.S. Navy, surgeon and leader of the U.S. Navy Operation Deep Freeze party at Hallett Station in 1958.

References 

Glaciers of Borchgrevink Coast